Valentine Browne may refer to several members of the family of the Earl of Kenmare:

Sir Valentine Browne  (died 1589)
Sir Valentine Browne (died 1626), MP for Lincolnshire (UK Parliament constituency), 1610-1614
Sir Valentine Browne, 1st Baronet (died 1633) of the Browne baronets of Molahiffe
Sir Valentine Browne, 2nd Baronet (died 1640) of the Browne baronets of Molahiffe
Valentine Browne, 1st Viscount Kenmare, 3rd Baronet (1638–1694)
Valentine Browne, 3rd Viscount Kenmare, 5th Baronet (1695–1736)
Valentine Browne, 1st Earl of Kenmare (1754–1812)
Valentine Browne, 2nd Earl of Kenmare (1788–1853)
Valentine Browne, 4th Earl of Kenmare (1825–1905), Member of Parliament 1852–1871
Valentine Browne, 5th Earl of Kenmare (1860–1941)
Valentine Browne, 6th Earl of Kenmare (1891–1943)

It may also refer to:

Valentine Browne, OFM (c. 1594–1672), Irish Franciscan theologian